An electric fireplace is an electric heater that mimics a fireplace burning coal, wood, or natural gas. Electric fireplaces are often placed in conventional fireplaces, which can then no longer be used for conventional fires. They plug into the wall, and can run on a "flame only" setting, or can be used as a heater, typically consuming 1.4-1.6 kW, that can heat a  room.

History

The electric fire was invented in 1912 and became popular in the 1950s.

Techniques for electrical "flame effects" have been around since at least 1981.

Commercial electric fireplace techniques include the Optiflame, introduced in 1988 by Dimplex.

Dimplex claims to have produced the first electric fireplace with a "realistic" wood-burning flame effect in 1995.  It is unclear what specific technique is being referred to, although it may be .

In 2008 Dimplex launched the Opti-myst effect which simulates both flames and smoke.

In 2013 Dimplex launched the Opti-V effect which combines realistic flickering flames with three dimensional LED logs that sporadically sparks and  an audio element of crackling logs.

Advantages compared to traditional fireplaces
Advantages of electric fireplaces are that they:
 do not require chimneys.
 are often portable.
 do not require remodeling to install.
 are more economical.
 are more convenient.
 are safer to use.
 do not require the maintenance needed for wood burning or gas fireplaces.

Disadvantages compared to traditional fireplaces
Disadvantages of electric fireplaces are that they:
 are typically more costly to operate compared to gas or wood burning heaters due to price of electricity;
are less efficient than other modern methods of electrical heating, e.g. heat pumps. COP of 1 vs. COP of 3-5 for heat pumps.
 are not as realistic as real flames, even those in gas fireplaces;
 cannot be exposed to weather.

See also 

 Firebox
 Fireplace insert
 Fireplace mantel
 Wood-fired oven

References

Fireplaces
Residential heating appliances